Themira nigricornis is a species of black scavenger fly in the family Sepsidae. It is found in Europe.

References

Further reading

 

Sepsidae
Diptera of Europe
Taxa named by Johann Wilhelm Meigen
Insects described in 1826